Belinda Wright (18 January 1929 – 1 April 2007) was an English ballerina noted for romantic and classical roles.

Life and career
She was born Brenda Wright in Southport, Lancashire (later Merseyside). She was the daughter of a coal merchant, and as a sickly child was advised to take dance classes for her health. She studied under Dorothea Halliwell, Olga Preobrajenska in Paris and Kathleen Crofton in London, and won awards for young dancers including the Anna Pavlova Cup and the Dancing Times Cup.

Wright began working with Ballet Rambert in 1946. After further studies, she joined the London Festival Ballet, where she danced as prima ballerina and became best known for her work in ballets including Harlequinade and Giselle. She also danced for Roland Petit's Ballet de Paris, Le Grand Ballet du Marquis de Cuevas, and the Royal Ballet. Her farewell performance took place in 1977 in Tokyo, and afterward she worked as a dance teacher.

Wright had two children. She was married to Swiss dancer Wolfgang Brunner but divorced in 1960. She married her dance partner Jelko Yuresha in 1961, and resided in Zurich, Switzerland, and New York. She died of coronary complications in Zurich at the age of 78.

References

1929 births
2007 deaths
People from Southport
Prima ballerinas
English ballerinas
Dancers of The Royal Ballet